Nat Brewis (16 April 1856 – 21 October 1921) was a Scotland international rugby union player. He became the 13th President of the Scottish Rugby Union.

Rugby union career

Amateur career
He played for Edinburgh Institution F.P.

Provincial career
Cross was capped by Edinburgh District to play against Glasgow District in the inter-city match in 1875.

He was selected and played in the Blues Trial side of 1878.

International career

Referee career
He refereed the East v West district match in early 1881.

Administrative career
He was Honorary Secretary of the Scottish Rugby Union in 1880–81. He attempted to bring in a North of Scotland District versus South of Scotland District match that season, but the fixture did not take place.

He was made the 13th President of the Scottish Rugby Union in 1885-86.

References

1856 births
1921 deaths
Rugby union players from Northumberland
Scottish rugby union players
Scotland international rugby union players
Presidents of the Scottish Rugby Union
Edinburgh Institution F.P. players
Blues Trial players
Edinburgh District (rugby union) players
Scottish rugby union referees
Scottish Districts referees